Ancillina is a genus of sea snails, marine gastropod mollusks in the family Ancillariidae.

Species
Species within the genus Ancillina include:
 Ancillina apicalis (Kay, 1979)
 Ancillina sumatrana (Thiele, 1925)

The species Gracilancilla lindae Petuch, 1987 hasn't been reassessed yet.

References

 Lozouet P. (1992) New Pliocene and Oligocene Olividae (Mollusca, Gastropoda) from France and the Mediterranean area. Contributions to Tertiary and Quaternary Geology 29(1-2): 27-37

Ancillariidae